Peter Schulting (born 19 August 1987) is a Dutch cyclist, who currently rides for UCI Continental team .

Major results

2007 
 5th Overall Tour de Berlin
1st Stage 3
 8th Scandinavian Open Road Race
2009
 8th Scandinavian Open Road Race
2010
 1st Kernen Omloop Echt-Susteren
 5th Ster van Zwolle
 9th Overall Festningsrittet
2011
 6th Antwerpse Havenpijl
 10th Ronde van Overijssel
2013
 8th Ster van Zwolle
2014
 6th Overall Tour du Maroc
 7th Arno Wallaard Memorial
 Les Challenges de la Marche Verte
7th GP Sakia El Hamra
10th GP Sakia Al Massira
2015
 10th Dorpenomloop Rucphen
2016
 1st Stage 3 Kreiz Breizh Elites
 2nd Overall Tour of Fuzhou
 3rd Overall Tour of Taihu Lake
 3rd Slag om Norg
 4th Overall Tour de Taiwan
1st  Mountains classification
1st Stage 3
 8th Omloop Het Nieuwsblad U23
2017
 1st Tobago Cycling Classic
 6th Rad am Ring
 7th Slag om Norg
 7th Ronde van Noord-Holland
 7th Dorpenomloop Rucphen
2018
 1st Tacx Pro Classic
 6th Midden–Brabant Poort Omloop
 8th Overall Tour of Romania
1st Stages 1 & 4
2022
 10th Overall Olympia's Tour
1st Stage 2

References

External links

1987 births
Living people
Dutch male cyclists
People from Ommen
20th-century Dutch people
21st-century Dutch people
Cyclists from Overijssel